Lee Marc Tomlin (born 12 January 1989) is an English professional footballer who is currently a player/coach for Ilkeston Town

Early life
Tomlin was born in Leicester, Leicestershire. He started his career with the youth system of Leicester City in 1996 before joining Rushden & Diamonds's youth system in 2005. In October 2005, he became Rushden's youngest ever first-team player when he came on as a substitute for Drewe Broughton in the 74th minute. Throughout the rest of the season he made several more substitute appearances, but his first start came in November 2005, in an FA Cup first round replay against Halifax Town. He made 21 appearances in League Two in the 2005–06 season.

Club career

Early career
Before the 2006–07 season, Tomlin attracted the attention of several big clubs and he earned a trial with Liverpool. Throughout the season, he made more starts and became more of a regular in the Rushden starting eleven. He scored his first goal for the club against Weymouth, the match after Paul Hart was sacked, in the 21st minute. He immediately followed this with another goal, this time against Altrincham in the FA Cup fourth qualifying round. He scored six goals during the season, playing as a forward and on both wings. Tomlin joined Southern League Premier Division club Brackley Town in October 2007 on a one-month loan, making two appearances.

Tomlin switched to left midfield for the 2009–10 season, under his influential manager Justin Edinburgh whom he credited for his development and achieving his move to the Football League. Following the end of the season a six-figure bid for Tomlin was rejected from another Blue Square Bet Premier club believed to be Crawley Town and Rushden confirmed he would be offered a new contract.

Peterborough United

Tomlin signed for League One club Peterborough United for an undisclosed fee on 6 August 2010. He went on to assist the team gain promotion with a hard working display against Huddersfield Town at Old Trafford, which The Posh won 3–0.

He continued to develop his reputation at Championship level and on 20 August 2011, he scored his first professional hat-trick in a game against Ipswich Town, helping Peterborough to a 7–1 win.

Tomlin beat five defenders to score in Peterborough's last game of the 2012–13 season, away to Crystal Palace, but a 3–2 defeat confirmed their relegation back to League One.

Middlesbrough
On 31 January 2014, Tomlin signed for Middlesbrough on loan for the remainder of the 2013–14 season with a view to a permanent move. On 18 February, it was announced that he had signed permanently on a three-and-a-half-year contract. Tomlin made his debut on 22 February in a 0–0 draw against Leeds United, coming on as a substitute for Kei Kamara. After a run of fine performances, most notable in Middlesbrough's 2–0 victory over Manchester City in the FA Cup, Tomlin was named Championship Player of the Month for January 2015.

AFC Bournemouth
On 4 August 2015, Tomlin signed for Premier League newcomers AFC Bournemouth on a three-year deal for a fee of around £3.5 million. He made his debut against Liverpool, coming on for Joshua King. He scored his only goal for Bournemouth in the 2015–16 season, a penalty against Birmingham City in the FA Cup.

Bristol City
Tomlin signed for Championship club, Bristol City on a season-long loan, on 27 January 2016. He later made his debut in a goalless draw against Birmingham City on 30 January. Tomlin went onto score 6 goals in 18 appearances, including goals in a 6–0 win over Bolton Wanderers and a 4–0 win over Huddersfield Town.

During the summer, Tomlin opened talks with Bristol City and took part in a medical on 4 July.

Cardiff City
On 13 July 2017, Tomlin joined Championship rivals Cardiff City on a three-year contract for an undisclosed fee, making his debut for the club on the opening day of the 2017–18 season during a 1–0 victory over Burton Albion.

On 31 January 2018, Tomlin joined Nottingham Forest on loan in a swap deal with Jamie Ward moving to Cardiff on loan in return. He scored his first goal for Forest in a 1–1 draw with Reading on 20 February 2018.

On 18 December 2018, it was announced that Tomlin was training with Peterborough United and would return to the club on loan from 1 January 2019 until the end of the season. However, the move was delayed due to paperwork issues. The transfer was eventually completed on 8 January.

Tomlin signed a new two-and-a-half year contract with Cardiff on 10 January 2020.

Tomlin left the club by mutual consent on 4 October 2021.

Walsall
On 25 February 2022, Tomlin signed for EFL League Two club Walsall on a short-term deal until the end of the 2021–22 season. Tomlin made five appearances with the club, four of which off the bench, before being released at the end of the season.

Doncaster Rovers and retirement
After playing for Doncaster Rovers in summer 2022, Tomlin retired due to injury in October 2022.

Ilkeston Town
On 1 December 2022, Tomlin came out of his retirement to join Ilkeston Town as player-coach.

International career
Tomlin was capped twice by the England national C team in 2009.

Career statistics

Honours
Peterborough United
Football League One play-offs: 2011

Cardiff City
EFL Championship runner-up: 2017–18

Individual
Football League Championship Player of the Month: January 2015

References

External links

1989 births
Living people
Footballers from Leicester
English footballers
England semi-pro international footballers
Association football midfielders
Association football forwards
Leicester City F.C. players
Rushden & Diamonds F.C. players
Brackley Town F.C. players
Peterborough United F.C. players
Middlesbrough F.C. players
AFC Bournemouth players
Bristol City F.C. players
Cardiff City F.C. players
Nottingham Forest F.C. players
Walsall F.C. players
Doncaster Rovers F.C. players
Ilkeston Town F.C. players
English Football League players
National League (English football) players
Southern Football League players
Premier League players